Recques-sur-Course is a commune in the Pas-de-Calais department in the Hauts-de-France region of France.

Geography
Recques-sur-Course is located 4 miles (6 km) north of Montreuil-sur-Mer on the D167 road and by the banks of the river Course.

Population

Places of interest
 The church of St.Leger, dating from the thirteenth century.
 A windmill
 The eighteenth century Louis XV style chateau de Recq.

See also
Communes of the Pas-de-Calais department

References

Recquessurcourse